The Central Institute of Road Transport (CIRT) is a Government of India undertaking, established under the then Ministry of Shipping and Transport and the Association of State Road Transport Undertakings (ASTRU). It is a nodal agency, known to be only one of its kind,  providing a platform for higher research and training on road transportation and assists in testing, guidance and consultancy in the field.

Profile 
The Central Institute of Road Transport (CIRT) is a Government of India undertaking, established in 1967, with an aim to improve the public transport system in India by developing efficient management systems through research and by providing testing and consultancy activities in the field of road transportation. The institute is located on the Pune-Nasik Highway in Pune in the state of Maharashtra, India. The institute works under the Association of State Road Transport Undertakings (ASTRU), which controls the State Road Transport Corporations.

The Institute makes services available to public and private sectors and undertakes projects and provides testing facilities through its various laboratories. CIRT is an accredited National Accreditation Board for Testing and Calibration Laboratories (NABL) laboratory and is a Government of India approved centre for vehicle and spare parts certification. A Governing Council consisting of government officials and State Transport representatives oversees the institute's activities under the Vice President of ASRTU, who acts as the ex-officio chairman.

CIRT ISO 9001 and ISO 14001 Certified by TUV Suddeutschland of Munich, Germany and holds memberships with the Association of Indian Management Schools (AIMS) and the Association of Management Development Institutions in South Asia (AMDISA).

Mandate
The institute is formed with a specified set of mandate
 To introduce modern organizational management principles and practices in the area of public transportation
 To provide a platform for higher research on transport development
 To provide consultancy services for the improvement of organizational and operational efficiency
 To provide training to transport professionals across the country on public transportation
 To assist Government and its agencies for evolving policies and legislation in road transport sector
 To prepare and prescribe standards, specifications and norms of vehicles and spare parts through quality evaluation and monitoring
 To act as the central agency for dissemination of information and technology with special emphasis on safety, environment and productivity
 To undertake research on quality upgradation of transport systems

Laboratory facilities

CIRT is equipped with modern equipment under its various laboratories.

Facilities

Other than the laboratories, CIRT has been accorded with modern facilities such as a library stocking over 10,000 titles, 100 professional journals and several educational films and videos, classrooms, gymnasium, tennis and badminton courts, guest houses, hostels and residential accommodation.

CIRT also maintains a computer centre, catering to the communication and data storage requirements of the institute.

Research and consultancy
CIRT has developed a platform for higher research in the areas of traffic management, planning of rapid transit systems for buses, bicycles etc., bus terminals, driver training institutes and integrated border check posts, road safety audit and Innovative Driving Test System (IDTS) using RFID technology. The Institute provides consultancy services for bus fleet procurement under JNNURM scheme, preparation of feasibility studies for infrastructure development projects, organizational restructuring of transport companies and advice on issues related to Motor Vehicles Act and Central Motor Vehicles Rules.

Courses
CIRT conducts regular courses for the employees of the State Transport organizations, which are classified into four types.

Foundation Courses: These are four to eight week programs, meant for management trainees and is conducted at the CIRT campus. The subject of the programs are decided mutually between CIRT and the relevant State Transport Undertaking.

Management Appreciation Programs: The program aimed at upgradation of senior supervisory level officers for their promotion to managerial cadre. The program is if 4 weeks duration and is conducted at the CIRT campus.

Short Duration Functional Programs: These programs are CIRT campus based or other chose venues and imparts studies in Maintenance Management, Traffic Management, Materials Management, Industrial Relations, Human Resource Management, Management Information Systems, Computer Applications and Financial Management.

In-Situ Programs: This program addresses specific problems of the client organization and is conducted at the client's premises.

International collaborations
CIRT has entered into collaborative arrangements with various international institutions such as:

Transport Research Laboratory of the United Kingdom: Joint research projects and exchange of professional staff.

University of Westminster: Exchange of faculty

University of Newcastle (Australia): Exchange of faculty

University of Loughborough: Exchange of faculty

TUV, Munich: MOU for testing automobile components, upgrading facilities and training personnel

UTAC, Paris: MOU for testing automobile components, upgrading facilities and training personnel

Institute of Road Safety Research, Hague: Negotiations are underway for establishing a Centre for Road Safety on CIRT campus.

Publications
CIRT publishes a journal, Indian Journal of Transport Management, (ISSN 0970-4736) at quarterly intervals, which covers the relevant topics in the transport sector such as transport policies, public and private sector participation, financing, affordability and quality of transport services. The journal is circulated in India and abroad and is listed catalogued by the American Library of Congress.

It also publishes research articles, papers and information on transportation.

See also

 Vehicle
 Automated highway system
 Road train
 Vehicle recovery
 Right- and left-hand traffic
 Road
 Public transport
 Traffic
 Traffic congestion
 Transport engineering

References

External links
 on Wikimapia
 Indian Journal of Transport Management on WorldCat

Transport organisations based in India
Research institutes in Pune
Educational organisations based in India
Transport research organizations
Road transport organizations
1967 establishments in Maharashtra
Research institutes established in 1967